The Embassy of Mexico in Berlin is the diplomatic mission of Mexico to Germany. The embassy is located in Klingelhöferstrasse 3, Berlin-Mitte.

The building was designed by architect Francisco Serrano, in collaboration with Teodoro González de León.

Ambassadors of Mexico to Germany

 Presidency of Gustavo Díaz Ordaz (1964–1970)
 (1964–1965): Mario Armando Amador Durón
 (1965–1970): Manuel de Jesús Cabrera Maciá
 Presidency of Luis Echeverría (1970–1976)
 (1970–1971): Manuel de Jesús Cabrera Maciá
 (1971–1972): Antonio Ruiz Galindo
 (1972–1973): Ismael Moreno Pino
 (1973–1974): Luis Jesús Weckmann Muñoz
 (1974–1976): Vicente Sánchez Gavito
 Presidency of José López Portillo (1976–1982)
 (1976–1977): Ulises Sergio Schmill Ordóñez
 (1977–1978): Felipe Raúl Valdez Aguilar
 (1978–1979): Roberto de Rosenzweig-Díaz Azmitia
 (1979–1982): Octaviano Campos Salas
 Presidency of Miguel de la Madrid (1982–1988)
 (1982–1987): César Sepúlveda Gutiérrez
 (1987–1988): Adolfo Enrique Hegewish Fernández
 Presidency of Carlos Salinas de Gortari (1988–1994)
 (1988–1990): Adolfo Enrique Hegewish Fernández
 (1990–1994): Juan José Bremer
 Presidency of Ernesto Zedillo (1994–2000)
 (1994–1998): Juan José Bremer
 (1998–2000): Roberto Emilio Friedrich Heinze
 Presidency of Vicente Fox (2000–2006)
 (2000–2002): Patricia Espinosa Cantellano
 (2002–2003): Jorge Eduardo Navarrete López
 (2003–2006): Jorge Castro-Valle Kuehne
 Presidency of Felipe Calderón Hinojosa (2006–2012)
 (2006–2011): Jorge Castro-Valle Kuehne
 (2011–2012): Francisco Gonzalez Dias
 Presidency of Enrique Peña Nieto (2012–2018)
 (2013–2019): Patricia Espinosa Cantellano
 Presidency of Andrés Manuel López Obrador (2018–Present)
 (2019–2021 ): Rogelio Granguillhome Morfin
 (2021– ): Francisco Quiroga

See also
Foreign relations of Mexico
Germany–Mexico relations
List of diplomatic missions of Mexico

References

External links
Mexican Ministry of Foreign Affairs

Berlin
Mexico
Germany–Mexico relations